Vesperus brevicollis is a species of brown coloured western European beetle in the family Vesperidae, found in Portugal and Spain.

References

Vesperidae
Beetles described in 1858
Beetles of Europe